"Come Back to What You Know" is a song by English rock band Embrace, released as the fourth single from their debut album, The Good Will Out (1998), on 25 May 1998. It remained the band's highest-charting single, reaching number six on the UK Singles Chart, until the release of "Nature's Law" in 2006.

The song "Love Is Back" is featured on the B-sides compilation Dry Kids: B-Sides 1997-2005.

Track listings

Charts

References

1998 singles
1998 songs
Embrace (English band) songs
Hut Records singles
Songs written by Danny McNamara
Songs written by Richard McNamara